Arthur Malette was an American Negro league shortstop in the 1910s.

Malette began his Negro leagues career in 1912 with the Cuban Giants. He went on to play two seasons with the Schenectady Mohawk Giants, and finished his career in 1916 with the Lincoln Stars.

References

External links
Baseball statistics and player information from Baseball-Reference Black Baseball Stats and Seamheads

Year of birth missing
Year of death missing
Place of birth missing
Place of death missing
Cuban Giants players
Lincoln Stars (baseball) players
Schenectady Mohawk Giants players
Baseball shortstops